Borbo binga, the dark forest swift, is a butterfly in the family Hesperiidae. It is found in The Ivory Coast, Ghana, Nigeria, the Republic of the Congo and the Democratic Republic of the Congo. Its habitat consists of forests.

References

Butterflies described in 1937
Hesperiinae